Bothies are remote, rural cottages that have outlived their original purposes but now are kept unlocked for people to take shelter or stay overnight without charge. They are located mostly in Scotland, with a small number in England and Wales, and have extremely basic facilities - with no electricity, gas, or piped water.  The Mountain Bothies Association, established in 1965, is a charity that maintains bothies.

Background

Bothies

Bothies are primitive shelters found primarily in Scotland (particularly in the Highlands) but also in remote parts of Wales and northern England. Highland Scotland has a low density of population by European standards, and in many remote areas the population has declined over the last 200 years due to emigration following the Highland Clearances and the Highland Potato Famine, together with migration to the cities because of industrialisation. In consequence, ruined but and ben cottages are often found abandoned in remote areas. Bothies were built for deer stalking (deer shooting), quarrying, cattle droving and shepherding but these have also fallen out of use.

The owners of these abandoned properties sometimes allow them be used freely by backpackers, climbers and the like – they are simply kept unlocked. There is no charge for use but neither are there any facilities – they have no electricity or piped water supply.

Mountain Bothies Association

The Mountain Bothies Association was established in 1965, becoming a Scottish charity in 1975, to take on the basic care and maintenance of some of these shelters, with the cooperation of the owners who sometimes help financially. The first bothy to be restored was Tunskeen. The organisation has over ninety bothies, mostly in Scotland but with a few in England and Wales all of which may be stayed in without any charges at all. Very rarely is there vehicular access and in some cases, even those located on the mainland are more directly accessible by boat.

The MBA aims to keep its properties windproof and waterproof so someone checks them a few times a year. At minimum there will be a table and a few chairs, and many bothies have a fireplace or stove although plenty do not. Fuel needs to be carried in (coal is best) – a blazing fire is known as "bothy TV".  MBA bothies sometimes have an outside toilet but when this is not the case a toilet spade is provided. Raised platforms or bunks have been installed for sleeping – sometimes the floor, particularly an attic floor, is also suitable.

Visitors are expected to bring food and bedding with them. Sometimes there are books, cooking equipment and so forth left by previous visitors. A bothy book (visitors' book) is an important aspect of bothying culture. There is no system for reserving places or checking availability so, if the need arises, more people may squeeze in even if it means that some other people may decide to sleep outside in their tents. Visitors are only expected to stay for a short period – for a night or two – before moving on. Large groups – six or more – and commercial groups are not allowed.

Deer stalking in Scotland

In the Scottish Highlands many bothies are situated on deer stalking estates and so in the stalking season the land owner may restrict access or the bothy may be closed completely. Red deer stag hunting is from 1 July to 20 October (often starting 15 September) and this is the time of the greatest likelihood of restrictions. However, hind culling starts 21 October and can extend into February. Elsewhere, in sheep country, the shepherds themselves may need to use a bothy at lambing time and they take priority over visitors. Estates often ask visitors to telephone in advance to enquire about restrictions. Warning notices will be displayed and a website maintains up-to-date access arrangements throughout Scotland.

List of MBA bothies
This sortable list includes all the Mountain Bothies Association bothies  as listed on their website. Traditionally these locations were not published but a change of policy in 2009 led to the locations being made openly available. In 2017 Geoff Allan published The Scottish Bothy Bible (referred to in the table as SBB), detailing all MBA bothies in Scotland as well as many other non-MBA bothies. Publication of this and other guides in recent years has led to controversy over the publicity of bothies and the 'bothy experience'. Some believe increased publicity in respect of bothies (as opposed to publicity of the maintenance work of the MBA) is detrimental to their long term sustainability. It has also been suggested that there should be a subcategory of bothies that are not publicised and are known only to MBA members, or alternatively, for no new bothies to be published beyond the MBA membership.

Maps

The locations of all the bothies listed in this article are available for mapping purposes.

Gallery of interior photographs

Notes

References

Citations

Works cited

 Note: the page numbers used here are those in the print version of the book. The online preview with the same ISBN and publication date has a different layout and pagination.

Further reading and external links

 http://www.mountainbothies.org.uk – MBA website.
 https://bothiesonabike.wordpress.com – "Bothies on a bike", Geoff Allan's blog while he was researching The Scottish Bothy Bible.
 
 
 
 

Lists of buildings and structures in Scotland
Lists of buildings and structures in England
Lists of buildings and structures in Wales
Mountain huts
Rural Scotland
Conservation in Scotland
Backpacking
Scotland geography-related lists
England geography-related lists
Wales geography-related lists